Closteropus is a genus of beetles in the family Cerambycidae, containing the following species:

 Closteropus argentatus Bates, 1879
 Closteropus blandus Guérin-Méneville, 1844
 Closteropus herteli Tippmann, 1960
 Closteropus speciosus (Klug, 1825)

References

Rhopalophorini